Greater Lakeburn is an area with enhanced services within the Canadian local service district of the parish of Moncton in Westmorland County, New Brunswick; it is sometimes erroneously cited as an LSD in its own right. It is situated in Southeastern New Brunswick, to the east of Dieppe.  This District contains the southern part of the community of Painsec and Melanson Settlement as well as a mostly treed area.  Greater Lakeburn is part of Greater Moncton.

History

Notable people

See also
List of local service districts in New Brunswick

Bordering communities

References

Communities in Greater Moncton
Communities in Westmorland County, New Brunswick
Designated places in New Brunswick
Local service districts of Westmorland County, New Brunswick